The following is a list of municipalities (comuni) in Calabria, Italy.

There are 404 municipalities in Calabria (as of January 2019):

80 in the Province of Catanzaro
150 in the Province of Cosenza
27 in the Province of Crotone
97 in the Metropolitan City of Reggio Calabria
50 in the Province of Vibo Valentia

List

References

 
Geography of Calabria
Calabria